Little Wizards, also called Young Wizards, is a 1987–1988 American animated series, created by Len Janson and Chuck Menville and produced by Marvel Productions and New World International.

The series follows the fortunes of Dexter, a young prince without a crown, whose father, the old king, is dead. Soon after that, the evil wizard Renvick stole the crown and proclaimed himself king. He ordered his servants to imprison Dexter for fear that he would get in his way. However, Dexter fled into the woods, where he was found by the good magician Phineas, who rescues him. Phineas lives with a young dragon called Lulu. When preparing a potion, Dexter unwittingly caused an explosion bringing to life three monsters endowed with magical powers – Winkle, Gump and Boo.

Ownership of the series passed to Disney in 2001 when Disney acquired Fox Kids Worldwide, which also includes Marvel Productions. The series is not available on Disney+.

Characters

Main 
 Dexter – a young prince without a crown, whose father, the former king is dead. He fled into the woods, where he was rescued by the good magician and teacher Phineas. He won a singing sword.
 Phineas Willodium – a magician and teacher, which he saved the prince Dexter from the hands of the evil wizard Renvick.
 Lulu – Phineas' dragon
Three monsters accidentally created by Dexter
 Winkle – a cheerful, childlike pink monster who can make herself fly after taking a deep breath.
 Gump – a grumpy orange monster who can shapeshift into other objects, but still retains many of his own features.
 Boo – a timid, cowardly blue monster who can turn invisible, except for his eyes.
 Renvick – an evil wizard, which he stole the crown from the late king, the father of the young prince Dexter and proclaimed himself king. He hates Phineas and the Little Wizards. At all costs he wants to beat them, but he doesn't always succeed.

Recurring 
 Clovie – a young servant girl. She holds the secret to Renvick and her mother and she helps the Little Wizards. She is probably in love with Dexter.
 William – Clovie's pet sparrow.

Production
Len Janson and Check Menville created the show for Marvel Productions and developing it for ABC. ABC had brought in consulting company Q5 Corporation to help develop the show along with other series for the 1987–1988 season. Q5's consultants consist of psychology PhDs and advertising, marketing and research professionals.

The show was promoted as a part of the third annual ABC Family Fun Fair, which brings the voice talent of the characters to perform highlights of their show. The show stopped in Oklahoma City Friday August 28 through Sunday August 30, 1987.

Episodes

References

External links 

1980s American animated television series
1987 American television series debuts
1988 American television series endings
American Broadcasting Company original programming
American children's animated fantasy television series
English-language television shows
Fictional humanoids
Fictional quartets
Television series by Disney–ABC Domestic Television
Television series by Marvel Productions
Television series by Saban Entertainment